The discography of Ab-Soul, an American hip hop recording artist, consists of five studio albums, two mixtapes, seventeen singles (including ten as a featured artist) and 30 music videos. Ab-Soul's first full-length project was a mixtape titled Longterm. The mixtape was released in 2009, as a free download via mixtape-sharing websites.

Studio albums

Mixtapes

Singles

As lead artist

As featured artist

Guest appearances

Music videos

As lead artist

As featured artist

See also 
 Black Hippy discography

References 

Discographies of American artists
Hip hop discographies